William Robertson FRSE FSA Scot (19 September 1721 – 11 June 1793) was a Scottish historian, minister in the Church of Scotland, and Principal of the University of Edinburgh. "The thirty years during which [he] presided over the University perhaps represent the highest point in its history." He made significant contributions to the writing of Scottish history and the history of Spain and Spanish America.

He was Chaplain of Stirling Castle and one of the King's Chaplains in Scotland.

Early life
Robertson was born at the manse of Borthwick, Midlothian, the son of Rev William Robertson (1686–1745), the local minister, and his wife Eleanor Pitcairn, daughter of David Pitcairne of Dreghorn. He was educated at Borthwick Parish School and Dalkeith Grammar School. The family moved to Edinburgh when his father became appointed minister of Lady Yester's Church in 1733. His father moved to Old Greyfriars Kirk in Edinburgh in 1736.

He studied divinity at the University of Edinburgh (1733–41), and was licensed to preach in 1741. He received a Doctor of Divinity in 1759.

The educationalist and writer James Burgh, who founded a dissenting academy on the outskirts of London, was his cousin, describing him as his "much esteemed friend and relation".

Career
He became minister at Gladsmuir (East Lothian) in 1743 and in 1759 at Lady Yester's Kirk and Greyfriars Kirk in Edinburgh. A staunch Presbyterian and Whig, he volunteered to defend the city against the Jacobites led by Prince Charles Edward Stuart in 1745.

In 1754 he was an original member of The Select Society, also referred to as the Edinburgh Select Society.

Robertson became royal chaplain to George III (1761), principal of the University of Edinburgh (1762), Moderator of the General Assembly of the Church of Scotland in 1763, and Historiographer Royal in 1764, reviving a role within the Royal household in Scotland that had been in abeyance from 1709 until 1763. He was also a member of The Poker Club.

Writings
One of his most notable works is his History of Scotland 1542–1603, begun in 1753 and first published in 1759. Robertson also contributed, not always fortunately, to the history of Spain and Spanish America in his History of America (1777), "the first sustained attempt to describe the discovery, conquest and settlement of Spanish America since Herrera's Décadas" and his biography of Charles V. In that work he had "provided a masterly survey of the progress of European society, in which he traced the erosion of the 'feudal system' caused by the rise of free towns, the revival of learning and Roman law, and by the emergence of royal authority and the balance of power between states. It was the development of commerce, assisted by law and private property, which was held to be chiefly responsible for the advance in civilisation."

Later life
He was a significant figure in the Scottish Enlightenment and also of the moderates in the Church of Scotland.

In 1783 he was a founding member of the Royal Society of Edinburgh.

He died of jaundice on 11 June 1793, at Grange House in south Edinburgh (the large, now-demolished mansion which gave its name to the Grange district). Robertson is buried at Greyfriars Kirkyard, Edinburgh. The grave is within a large stone mausoleum, second only to William Adam's mausoleum immediately to the south. Both stand to the south-west of the church, near the entrance to the Covenanters' Prison.

Legacy

He gives his name to the William Robertson Building of the Old Medical School buildings at the University of Edinburgh on Teviot Place, home to the School of History, Classics and Archaeology. There is also an endowed chair at Edinburgh in his name, the William Robertson Chair of History, for a specialist in non-European modern history.

Family

Robertson married his cousin Mary Nisbet (daughter of Rev James Nisbet of Old Kirk, St Giles) in 1751. They had six children, two daughters and four sons. Three of his children are buried in Greyfriars Kirkyard in individual plots behind their father's mausoleum:

Hon William Robertson, Lord Robertson FRSE, Senator of the College of Justice (1753–1835)
General James Robertson (died 1845)
Lt Col David Robertson MacDonald of Kinlochmoidart FRSE (1761–1845) an important figure in the history of Ceylon

One of his daughters, Mary, married the author Patrick Brydone FRSE. In 1778 his daughter, Eleanora (or Eleanor) Robertson, married John Russell WS FRSE (1753–1792), a Director of the Royal Bank of Scotland. Their children included John Russell WS FRSE (1780–1862), Principal Clerk of Session.

He was great uncle to Dr William Robertson FRSE (1818-1882).

Publications
 The Situation of the World at the Time of Christ's Appearance (sermon) (1755)
 The History of Scotland 1542–1603 (1759) (3 vols.)
 History of the Reign of the Emperor Charles V, with a View of the Progress of Society in Europe (1769) (3 later 4 vols.)
 The History of America (1777, 1796) (3 vols.)
 An Historical Disquisition Concerning the Knowledge Which the Ancients Had of India (1791)

References

Further reading
Brown, S. J. (ed.), William Robertson and the Expansion of Empire, Cambridge, 1997
László Kontler, Translations, Histories, Enlightenments: William Robertson in Germany, 1760–1795, 978-1-349-47575-9, 978-1-137-37172-0, 978-1-137-37171-3 	Palgrave Macmillan US 	2014

External links 

 William Robertson at James Boswell – a Guide

Principals of the University of Edinburgh
Moderators of the General Assembly of the Church of Scotland
People from Midlothian
18th-century Scottish historians
Academics of the University of Edinburgh
Alumni of the University of Edinburgh
1721 births
1793 deaths
Burials at Greyfriars Kirkyard
Members of the Philosophical Society of Edinburgh
Fellows of the Royal Society of Edinburgh
18th-century Ministers of the Church of Scotland
Whig (British political party) politicians
Historians of Scotland
British Hispanists
Fellows of the Society of Antiquaries of Scotland